Clifford Raymond Pennington (April 18, 1940 – May 26, 2020) was a Canadian professional ice hockey forward who played 102 games in the National Hockey League for the Montreal Canadiens and Boston Bruins between 1961 and 1962. Internationally Pennington played for the Canadian national team at the 1960 Winter Olympics, winning a silver medal. He died in 2020.

Career statistics

Regular season and playoffs

International

Awards and achievements
Turnbull Cup MJHL Championship (1956)
EPHL Championships (1961 & 1963)
EPHL First All-Star Team (1962)
EHL South First All-Star Team (1969)
IHL First All-Star Team (1970)
IHL MVP (1970)
Honoured Member of the Manitoba Hockey Hall of Fame

References

External links

1940 births
2020 deaths
Boston Bruins players
Canadian ice hockey centres
Des Moines Oak Leafs players
Edmonton Oil Kings (WCHL) players
Flin Flon Bombers players
Hull-Ottawa Canadiens players
Ice hockey players at the 1960 Winter Olympics
Jacksonville Rockets players
Kingston Frontenacs (EPHL) players
Los Angeles Blades (WHL) players
Medalists at the 1960 Winter Olympics
Montreal Canadiens players
Nashville Dixie Flyers players
Ontario Hockey Association Senior A League (1890–1979) players
Olympic ice hockey players of Canada
Olympic medalists in ice hockey
Olympic silver medalists for Canada
Quebec Aces (AHL) players
San Francisco Seals (ice hockey) players
St. Boniface Canadiens players
Ice hockey people from Winnipeg
Suncoast Suns (EHL) players
Suncoast Suns (SHL) players
Winnipeg Warriors (minor pro) players